Twożywo was a Polish artistic grouping active in early 21st century. Formed in Warsaw in 1995 by Krzysztof Sidorek and Mariusz Libel, the group was initially known for their "vlepki" - sticker art posted inside Warsaw's city busses. Soon Twożywo moved to larger forms and became pioneers of street art in Poland. Twożywo's posters, murals, billboards and press illustrations were often inspired by constructivism, pop-art, early 20th century futurism and concrete poetry. In 2006 the group was awarded the prestigious Paszport Polityki award of the Polityka weekly. The group disbanded in 2011.

References
 Twożywo, culture.pl

Artists from Warsaw
Polish artist groups and collectives